Plainfield is an unincorporated community in Yolo County, California. It is located between Davis and Woodland in the central portion of the county. Plainfield's ZIP Code is 95695 and its area code 530. A post office was established in the community in 1873 but was discontinued in 1908. Plainfield is the location of Plainfield Station, a locally popular bar and grill.

References

External links
West Plainfield Fire Department

Unincorporated communities in California
Unincorporated communities in Yolo County, California
Unincorporated communities in the Sacramento metropolitan area